Sanganer (Assembly constituency) is one of constituencies of Rajasthan Legislative Assembly in the Jaipur (Lok Sabha constituency).

Sanganer Constituency covers all voters from Jaipur Municipal Corporation Ward numbers 24 to 32.

Member of Legislative Assembly

Election results

References

See also 
 Member of the Legislative Assembly (India)

Jaipur district
Assembly constituencies of Rajasthan